In Internet slang, Internet minute refers to a brief look at what happens around the world within a space of just 60 seconds on the World Wide Web. The internet minute takes account on social media platforms and other Internet access services. It further elaborates that generally it takes a nanosecond for a breaking news story to be dubbed as fake or a conspiracy theory on social media platforms.

As of 2017, in a space of one minute in the Internet around 46,200 photos and posts were shared in Instagram. As of 2019, the logins in Facebook were reportedly estimated at around 1 million in a single minute.

References 

Internet terminology
Internet culture